George Quayle Morris (February 20, 1874 – April 23, 1962) was a member of the Quorum of the Twelve Apostles  in the Church of Jesus Christ of Latter-day Saints (LDS Church) from 1954 until his death.

Morris was born in Salt Lake City, Utah Territory, to Elias Morris and Mary Lois Walker.

George Teasdale, a member of the Quorum of the Twelve Apostles, ordained George Q. Morris a Seventy on September 13, 1899. Morris was called on a mission to Great Britain in 1899, and served there until 1902. He was set apart as a president in the Second Quorum of Seventy August 19, 1904. He served as president of the Eastern States Mission from 1948 to 1951.

Morris married Emma Ramsey (1878–1964) on June 29, 1905; they had three daughters: Marian, Margery, and Helen.

Morris was a businessman. He was president of Elias Morris and Sons, a company involved in tile and gravestone production. He was president of Purdential Savings and Loan Association. He was heavily involved with the Boy Scouts as well. 

From 1935 to 1937, Morris was the First Assistant to Albert E. Bowen, the Superintendent of the Young Men's Mutual Improvement Association (YMMIA). In 1937, when Bowen became a member of the Quorum of the Twelve Apostles, Morris succeeded him as YMMIA Superintendent. Morris held this position until 1948, when he was succeeded by Elbert R. Curtis.

Morris became a general authority of the LDS Church on October 6, 1951, when he was appointed an Assistant to the Quorum of the Twelve Apostles.

Morris was ordained an apostle and became a member of the Quorum of the Twelve Apostles on April 8, 1954, aged 80. He was selected and ordained by church president David O. McKay. Morris replaced Matthew Cowley in the Quorum, who had died the previous December. Morris was the oldest person in church history to become an apostle and a member of the Quorum of the Twelve.

Morris died on April 23, 1962, aged 88, in Salt Lake City. He was buried at Salt Lake City Cemetery. His vacancy in the Quorum of the Twelve was filled by N. Eldon Tanner.

References

1874 births
1962 deaths
American general authorities (LDS Church)
American Mormon missionaries in England
American Mormon missionaries in the United States
Apostles (LDS Church)
Counselors in the General Presidency of the Young Men (organization)
Mission presidents (LDS Church)
People from Salt Lake City
19th-century Mormon missionaries
20th-century Mormon missionaries
Assistants to the Quorum of the Twelve Apostles
General Presidents of the Young Men (organization)
Burials at Salt Lake City Cemetery
Latter Day Saints from Utah